Elverum Håndball is a Norwegian handball club from Elverum, Norway. Currently, Elverum Håndball competes in the Norwegian Premier League Men's Handball, and they have been successful title winners for several years consecutively. The club was founded in 1946 by a group of 26 people. The Norway national team coach, Christian Berge, was coach for Elverum Håndball from 2008 to 2014 which he had to leave in order to coach the Norway men’s national team.

Kits

Achievements
Norwegian League
 Winner: 2012/13, 2016/17, 2017/18, 2019/20, 2020/21, 2021/22
 Silver: 2018/2019
Norwegian League Playoffs
 Winner: 1994/95, 2007/08, 2011/12, 2012/13, 2013/14, 2014/15, 2015/16, 2016/17, 2017/18, 2018/19, 2021/22
Norwegian Cup:
 Winner: 2009/10, 2018, 2019, 2020, 2021
 Finalist: 1962 (outdoors), 1963, 1965, 2008, 2012, 2016, 2022/23

Team

Current squad
Squad for the 2022–23 season

Goalkeepers
 1  Šimon Mizera
 12  Emil Kheri Imsgard 
Wingers
LW
 17  Orri Freyr Thorkelsson
 33  Sindre Heldal
RW
 4  Christopher Hedberg
 7  Kasper Lien
Line players
 5  Kristian Hübert Larsen
 11  Kassem Awad
 20  Endre Langaas

Back players
LB
2  Daniel Blomgren
 13  Uroš Borzaš
 14  Niclas Fingren
 18  Antonio Serradilla
CB
 3  Josip Vidović
 15  Tobias Grøndahl
RB
 9  Patrick Helland Anderson
 45  Benjamin Berg

Transfers
Transfers for the 2023–24 season

 Joining
  Robin Paulsen Haug (GK) (from  Skjern Håndbold)

 Leaving
  Emil Kheri Imsgard (GK) (to  SC Pick Szeged)

Out on loan
  Alexander Mitrovic (RB) (on loan at  Fjellhammer IL)

Notable players
Arnulf Bæk
Christian Berge
Ingimundur Ingimundarson
Lazo Majnov
Stig Rasch
Steffen Stegavik
Tamás Iváncsik
Sigvaldi Guðjónsson
Lukas Sandell

European record

References 

Norwegian handball clubs
Elverum